Phillip Drew (born 1986 in Wellington) is a New Zealand croquet player.

Phillip is a University Student studying Psychology, Commerce, and is a current recipient of a New Zealand Prime Minister's Athlete Scholarship.

Phillip represented New Zealand in the 2006 "A" series tournament against Australia.
Phillip was a qualifier in the 2006 Golf Croquet World Championships and has been awarded a Wild Card for the 2008 WCF World Golf Croquet Championships in Cape Town, South Africa. Two-time winner of the NZ "Edwina Thompson Silver Tray" (event for the second-tier players in New Zealand). Phillip is also a current member of the New Zealand Youth Squad.

Start of career 
Phillip started playing croquet when introduced to the game by his parents at the age of 7. In his younger days Phillip was known for outrageous hairstyles, including a Mohawk inspired by Vyvyan from the Young Ones.

Achievements 
New Zealand Ranking at 16 March 2009: 10
World Ranking at 16 March 2009: 41

External links
Current World Rankings

1986 births
Living people
New Zealand croquet players